Sysoyeva is a rural locality (a village) in Krasnovishersky District, Perm Krai, Russia. The population was 1 as of 2010.

Geography 
Sysoyeva is located 174 km southeast of Krasnovishersk (the district's administrative centre) by road. Antipina is the nearest rural locality.

References 

Rural localities in Krasnovishersky District